Malév  Flight 240 was a regular service from Budapest Ferihegy International Airport, Hungary, to Beirut International Airport, Lebanon. On 30 September 1975, the aircraft operating the route, a Tupolev Tu-154 of Malév Hungarian Airlines, on its final approach for landing, crashed into the Mediterranean Sea just off the coast of Lebanon. All fifty passengers and ten crew on board are thought to have been killed. No official statement was ever made on the crash and its cause has never been publicly disclosed.

On 27 September 2007, Hungarian politician György Szilvásy, then Minister of Civil Intelligence Services, wrote a letter to Róbert Répássy, Fidesz party member of the Hungarian Parliament, stating that Hungarian civilian national security services (Információs Hivatal and  Nemzetbiztonsági Hivatal) had produced a report on the crash in 2003, and that the report stated that there were no available original (secret service) documents concerning the case. Szilvásy's letter affirmed that the report remains top secret, for reasons not connected to the crash.

Hungarian television station Hír TV has carried a documentary film covering the incident. In December 2008, Dutch broadcaster NTR aired a piece on Malév Flight 240 alleging that there is existing photographic documentation of the search and rescue or recovery operation, and that fifteen unidentified bodies were recovered.

According to unidentified witnesses, the plane was shot down, seen by a British military pilot and radar operators on a British radar station in Cyprus.

References

External links
 Magazine article in Hetek news magazine (in Hungarian), 12 December 2003
 News article in Nethírlap online newspaper (in Hungarian), 30 September 2005
 The Lost Malev – website dedicated to Malév Flight 240

Video recordings 
  Titkok légijárata (Flight of Secrets) – Youtube.com, documentary in Hungarian
  Az elveszett járat - MA 240 (The lost flight - MA 240) – Youtube.com, documentary in Hungarian

Aviation accidents and incidents in Lebanon
Aviation accidents and incidents in 1975
1975 in Lebanon
Accidents and incidents involving the Tupolev Tu-154
Airliner accidents and incidents with an unknown cause
Malév Hungarian Airlines accidents and incidents
Conspiracy theories involving aviation incidents
September 1975 events in Asia
1975 disasters in Lebanon